Nick Farquharson (born 7 September 1988 in Coventry) is an English footballer who used to belong to Crewe Alexandra.

Career
Farquharson began his career at the Crewe Alexandra academy, well known for its production of strikers. He progressed through the academy ranks and was named as Crewe's Under-18s captain for their 2006-07 campaign which saw the team progress well in their FA Youth Cup campaign before being knocked out by Cambridge United.

Following a brief spell at Witton Albion during the final third of the 06–07 season, which saw Farquharson score two goals in seven games, the young Englishman was awarded a professional contract at Crewe. The following season Farquharson made his professional debut for the club in their Football League Trophy exit to Chester City. Following the game, Crewe Technical Director Dario Gradi commented that Farquharson was "a little nervous and it became a bit of ordeal for him", however Gradi also commented that the young striker showed "flashes of his ability".

In January 2008, he went on loan to neighbors Nantwich Town. After completing his loan move at Nantwich Town Farquharson was then released by Crewe Alexandra in May 2008.

References

1988 births
Crewe Alexandra F.C. players
Northwich Victoria F.C. players
Nantwich Town F.C. players
Living people
Footballers from Coventry
Association football forwards
English footballers